Thomas Adams (April 20, 1804 – January 2, 1869) was sheriff of Norfolk County, Massachusetts, from 1848 to 1852, and from 1853 to January 1, 1857.

Biography
Adams was born in Quincy, Massachusetts, on April 20, 1804.  Early in life, Adams worked as a butcher alongside his father; later, he owned several different stage lines and traded in horses.  Adams married Mehetabel Field, the daughter of Joseph and Relief (Baxter) Field on April 4, 1826.

Adams died of apoplexy on January 2, 1869.

References

1804 births
People from Quincy, Massachusetts
People from Braintree, Massachusetts
High Sheriffs of Norfolk County
19th-century American people
Politicians from Quincy, Massachusetts
Massachusetts Whigs
1869 deaths
 butchers